The elegant mabuya (Trachylepis elegans) is a species of skink found in Madagascar.

References

Trachylepis
Reptiles described in 1854
Taxa named by Wilhelm Peters